The 5th Korea Drama Awards is an awards ceremony for excellence in television in South Korea. It was held at the Kyungnam Culture and Arts Center in Jinju, South Gyeongsang Province on October 2, 2012 and hosted by Jun Hyun-moo and Jewelry's Kim Eun-jung. The nominees were chosen from Korean dramas that aired from October 2011 to September 2012.

Nominations and winners
(Winners denoted in bold)

References

External links 
  
 5th Korea Drama Awards  at Daum 

Korea Drama Awards
Korea Drama Awards
Korea Drama Awards